Paratoceras is an extinct genus of Artiodactyla, of the family Protoceratidae, endemic to North America. Paratoceras resembled deer, but were more closely related to camels. In addition to having horns on the top of the head, they had a third horn on the snout.

Species
 P. coatesi 
 P. macadamsi 
 P. orarius 
 P. tedfordi 
 P. wardi

Fossil distribution 
Fossils have been recovered from: 
 Gaillard Cut, Cucaracha Formation, Panama 
 Balumtun Sandstone, Chiapas, Mexico
 Suchilquitongo Formation, Oaxaca , Mexico
 Trinity River Pit 1, Fleming Formation, San Jacinto County, Texas

References 

 
Miocene even-toed ungulates
Burdigalian life
Langhian life
Miocene mammals of North America
Hemingfordian
Barstovian
Clarendonian
Fossils of Mexico
Fossils of Panama
Fossils of the United States
Fossil taxa described in 1937
Prehistoric even-toed ungulate genera